The Institution of Mechanical Engineers (IMechE) is an independent professional association and learned society headquartered in London, United Kingdom, that represents mechanical engineers and the engineering profession. With over 120,000 members in 140 countries, working across industries such as railways, automotive, aerospace, manufacturing, energy, biomedical and construction, the Institution is licensed by the Engineering Council to assess candidates for inclusion on its Register of Chartered Engineers, Incorporated Engineers and Engineering Technicians.

The Institution was founded at the Queen's Hotel, Birmingham, by George Stephenson in 1847. It received a Royal Charter in 1930. The Institution's headquarters, purpose-built for the Institution in 1899, is situated at No. 1 Birdcage Walk in central London.

Origins 

Informal meetings are said to have taken place in 1846, at locomotive designer Charles Beyer's house in Cecil Street, Manchester, or alternatively at Bromsgrove at the house of James McConnell, after viewing locomotive trials at the Lickey Incline. Beyer, Richard Peacock, George Selby, Archibald Slate and Edward Humphrys were present. Bromsgrove seems the more likely candidate for the initial discussion, not least because McConnell was the driving force in the early years. A meeting took place at the Queen's Hotel in Birmingham to consider the idea further on 7 October and a committee appointed with McDonnell at its head to see the idea to its inauguration.

The Institution of Mechanical Engineers was then founded on 27 January 1847, in the Queen's Hotel next to Curzon Street station in Birmingham by the railway pioneer George Stephenson and others. McConnnell became the first chairman. The founding of the Institution was said by Stephenson's biographer Samuel Smiles to have been spurred by outrage that Stephenson, the most famous mechanical engineer of the age, had been refused admission to the Institution of Civil Engineers unless he sent in "a probationary essay as proof of his capacity as an engineer". However, this account has been challenged as part of a pattern of exaggeration on Smiles' part aimed at glorifying the struggles that various Victorian mechanical engineers had to overcome in their personal efforts to attain greatness. Though there was certainly coolness between Stephenson and the Institution of Civil Engineers, it is more likely that the motivation behind the founding of the Institution of Mechanical Engineers was simply the need for a specific home for the growing number of mechanical engineers employed in the burgeoning railway and manufacturing industries.

Beyer proposed that George Stephenson become the Institution's first president in 1847, followed by his son, Robert Stephenson, in 1849. Beyer became vice-president and was one of the first to present papers to the Institution; Charles Geach was the first treasurer. Throughout the 19th and 20th centuries some of Britain's most notable engineers held the position of president, including Joseph Whitworth, Carl Wilhelm Siemens and Harry Ricardo. It operated from premises in Birmingham until 1877 when it moved to London, taking up its present headquarters on Birdcage Walk in 1899.

Birdcage Walk 

Upon its move to London in 1877 the Institution rented premises at No. 10 Victoria Chambers, where it remained for 20 years. In 1895 the Institution bought a plot of land at Storey's Gate, on the eastern end of Birdcage Walk, for £9,500. Architect Basil Slade looked to the newly-completed Admiralty buildings facing the site for inspiration. The building was designed in the Queen Anne, 'streaky bacon', style in red brick and Portland stone. Inside, there were several features that were state of the art for the time, including a telephone, a 54-inch fan in the lecture theatre for driving air into the building, an electric lift from the Otis Elevator Company, and a Synchronome master-clock, which controlled all house timepieces. In 1933 architect James Miller, who also designed the neighbouring Institution of Civil Engineers, remodelled the building, expanding the library and introducing electric lighting.

The building would go on to host the first public presentation of Frank Whittle's jet engine in 1945. In 1943 it became the venue for the Royal Electrical & Mechanical Engineers' planning of Operation Overlord and the invasion of Normandy.

Today No. 1 Birdcage Walk hosts events, lectures, seminars and meetings in 17 conference and meeting rooms named after notable former members of the Institution, such as Whittle, Stephenson and Charles Parsons.

Membership grades and post-nominals 
The following are membership grades with post-nominals :
Affiliate: (no post-nominal) The grade for students, apprentices and those interested in or involved in mechanical engineering who do not meet the requirements for the following grades.
AMIMechE: Associate Member of the Institution of Mechanical Engineers: this is the grade for graduates (of acceptable degrees or equivalents in engineering, mathematics or science)
MIMechE: Member of the Institution of Mechanical Engineers. For those who meet the educational and professional requirements for registration as a Chartered Mechanical Engineer (CEng, MIMechE) and also as a Chartered Engineer (CEng) or Incorporated Engineer (IEng) or Engineering Technician (EngTech) in mechanical engineering.
FIMechE: Fellow of the Institution of Mechanical Engineers.  This is the highest class of elected membership, and is awarded to individuals who have demonstrated exceptional commitment to and innovation in mechanical engineering.

Awards
The James Watt International Medal is an award for excellence in engineering established in 1937 by the Institution of Mechanical Engineers. It is named after Scottish engineer James Watt (1736-1819) who developed the Watt steam engine in 1781, which was fundamental to the changes brought by the Industrial Revolution in both his native Great Britain and the rest of the world.

The Whitworth Scholarship is awarded to a few promising engineers of the main engineering disciplines for the length of a degree course.  On successful completion, they become Whitworth Scholars, with a medal and are entitled to use post-nominals Wh.Sch..  It was founded by Joseph Whitworth.

The Engineering Heritage Awards were created in 1984 to help recognise and promote the value of artefacts, locations, collections and landmarks of significant engineering importance.

Along with The Manufacturer, the Institution also runs The Manufacturer MX Awards, and Formula Student, the world's largest student motorsport event.

The Tribology Gold Medal is awarded each year for outstanding and supreme achievement in the field of tribology. It is funded from The Tribology Trust Fund. It was established and first awarded in 1972. As of 2017, it has been awarded to 39 individuals from 12 different countries.

Presidents 

, there have been 135 presidents of the Institution, who since 1922 have been elected annually for one year. The first president was George Stephenson, followed by his son Robert. Prior to 2018, Joseph Whitworth, John Penn and William Armstrong were the only presidents to have served two terms.

Pamela Liversidge in 1997 became the first female president; Professor Isobel Pollock became the second in 2012 and Carolyn Griffiths became the third in 2017.

List of presidents

† Baker resigned in June 2018. The Institution's by-laws state that a casual vacancy for President shall be filled by appointing a Past President to the role; Tony Roche was elected and duly took up office for a second term in August of that year.

Engineering Committees 
The Institution of Mechanical Engineers has a number of committees that work to promote and develop thought leadership in different industry sectors. The Institution has 8 divisions: - Aerospace, Automobile, Biomedical Engineering Association, Construction & Building Services, Manufacturing Industries, Power Industries, Process Industries and Railway.

Biomedical Engineering Association (BmEA) aims to bring together key workers from both medicine and engineering to discuss the latest advances and issues, to enable networking among different industry leaders, and to promote the field of Medical Engineering, also known as Bioengineering or Biomedical Engineering, to government, healthcare professionals and the wider public. This committee offers:
 seminars, lectures and conferences every year;
 the Journal of Engineering in Medicine;
 the annual Student Project Competition.

The Railway Division was formed in 1969 when the Institution of Locomotive Engineers amalgamated with IMechE.

Arms

See also 
 Engineering
 James Watt International Medal
 Chartered Engineer
 Proceedings of the Institution of Mechanical Engineers

Footnotes

References

Sources

External links 
 IMechE Official website
 Professional Engineering magazine website

 
1847 establishments in the United Kingdom
ECUK Licensed Members
Mechanical engineering organizations
Organisations based in the City of Westminster
Organizations established in 1847
Learned societies of the United Kingdom